The Sac and Fox Nation (Mesquakie language:  Othâkîwaki / Thakiwaki or Sa ki wa ki) is the largest of three federally recognized tribes of Sauk and Meskwaki (Fox) Indian peoples. Originally from the Lake Huron and Lake Michigan area, they were forcibly relocated to Oklahoma in the 1870s and are predominantly Sauk.  The "Sac and Fox OTSA" is the land area in Oklahoma governed by the tribe.

The two other Sac and Fox tribes are the Sac and Fox Tribe of the Mississippi in Iowa and the Sac and Fox Nation of Missouri in Kansas and Nebraska. The Sac and Fox tribes have historically been closely allied, and continue to be in the present day. They speak very similar Algonquian languages, which are sometimes considered to be two dialects of the same language, rather than separate languages. Thakiwaki and Sa ki wa ki mean "people coming forth from the water".

Government
The Sac and Fox Nation is headquartered in Stroud, Oklahoma, and their tribal jurisdictional area covers Lincoln, Payne, and Pottawatomie counties. Their Principal Chief is Don Abney. A council of five elected officials, each elected for a four-year term, govern the tribe. Elections are held in August in odd-numbered years.

Of the 3,794 enrolled tribal members, 2,557 live in Oklahoma. Membership in the tribe requires a minimum 1/8 blood quantum, with proven descent to ancestors on recognized rolls.

Economic development
The tribe's housing authority is located in Shawnee, Oklahoma. They issue their own tribal vehicle tags and operate eleven smoke shops and two casinos, The Blackhawk Casino in Shawnee and the Sac and Fox Nation Casino in Stroud. The Stroud casino features the Center Sky Stage, a live entertainment venue.

History
The Sac or Thakiwaki lived near Lake Huron and Lake Michigan at the time of European contact. In 1832 they participated in the Black Hawk War against the United States. Military leader Black Hawk remains a cultural hero today. After the war, the tribe relocated several times from Illinois to Iowa, Kansas, and finally Indian Territory in the 1870s.

But by the late 19th century, US policy changed again. Under the Dawes Act of 1887, these tribal land holdings were divided into 160-acre allotments for individual households, intended to encourage the Native Americans to establish subsistence farming according to the European-American cultural ways. Not only did the act not recognize Native American culture, but in many places in this arid land, the allotments were too small to be farmed successfully. Their land was allotted under a June 12, 1890 agreement with the Cherokee Commission. (Individual commissions were set up to manage the allotment of lands of various tribes in Native American Territory. Land remaining after the allotments was declared "surplus" by the US and sold, primarily to non-Natives. Under the related Curtis Act of 1893, the tribal government and its institutions were dismantled. 

The tribe was previously known as the Sac and Fox Tribe of Indians of the Mississippi River. The Sac and Fox tribe had historically occupied large portions of Wisconsin, Iowa, and Missouri, which they gradually ceded to the US by treaties forced by European-American encroachment. By an October 11, 1842 treaty they removed out of the Midwest to a reservation in Kansas. 

By 1889 519 of the tribe were located in Indian Territory, what is now central Oklahoma. On June 10, 1890, they ceded these Indian Territory lands to the federal government.

Self-government re-established in 20th century
The administration of President Franklin D. Roosevelt established what was called an "Indian New Deal", passing a law to encourage tribes to re-establish self-government. The Oklahoma Indian Welfare Act of 1934 was passed by its legislature in a similar effort. In 1937, the Sac and Fox organized Under these laws and gained federal recognition as a tribe, with an independent relationship to the federal government. They have areas of tribal jurisdiction in Oklahoma, while no longer having a reservation.

Under their constitution, they established tribal membership as applying to everyone listed on the tribal Dawes Rolls and their descendants, as long as individuals had a minimum blood quantum of one-eighth Sac and Fox blood (equivalent to one great-grandparent). They recognize that descendants may be brought up as culturally Sac and Fox while having mixed ancestry.

Late 20th century to present
The tribe has become increasingly active in asserting its sovereignty since the late 20th century. In 1983, the tribal government established its own system for registering vehicles and issuing license plates for tribal members. The state of Oklahoma tried to collect registration fees anyway, and the tribe sued. The US Supreme Court ruled in the tribe's favor of its independent sovereignty on May 17, 1993, in Oklahoma Tax Commission v. Sac & Fox Nation. Other tribes have since established their own systems for vehicle registration on tribal lands. The Sac and Fox Nation celebrate May 17 as "Victory Day."

Tribal officials have concentrated on the federal management of trust land fees and environmental issues on their land that has been leased for oil production. On May 16, 1989, a tribal representative group that included Elmer Manatowa, Principal Chief; Truman Carter, Treasurer; William Rice, Attorney General; James L. Welsh III, Director of Real Estate; and Curtis Cunard, Petroleum Consultant, testified before the 101st Congress, Special Committee on Investigations of the Select Committee on Indian Affairs, United States Senate. The testimony examined the federal government's management of water and natural resources of the Sac and Fox Nation. They testified to the extensive surface damage and permanent contamination of the tribal drinking water, which was destroyed by waterflooding techniques and the injection well process used by the oil companies. These officers also testified to the lack of federal oversight and trust management responsibilities, including fraudulent real estate appraisals of their lands. This historic testimony by the tribe's representatives, the result of their internal investigations, revealed the extensive mismanagement of the Bureau of Indian Affairs (BIA) and its failure in carrying out trust responsibilities. 

This was one of a series of suits by tribes against the government on the financial management of trust land fees. As a result, the BIA has made significant trust management changes. Through the courts, the US and the Sac and Fox Nation came to historic financial settlements in compensation for some of the damage.

Notable members

Saginaw Grant (1936–2021), actor known for his roles in Breaking Bad and The Lone Ranger.
Jim Thorpe (1888–1953), athlete who won gold medals in the decathlon and pentathlon at the 1912 Stockholm Olympics.

See also

Lake Osakis
Meskwaki
Sac and Fox Nation of Missouri in Kansas and Nebraska
Sac and Fox Reservation
Sac and Fox Tribe of the Mississippi in Iowa
Unga-Chuk

References

External links

 Sac and Fox Nation, official website

Sac and Fox
Native American tribes in Oklahoma
Federally recognized tribes in the United States